In category theory, a natural numbers object (NNO) is an object endowed with a recursive structure similar to natural numbers. More precisely, in a category E with a terminal object 1, an NNO N is given by:

 a global element z : 1 → N, and
 an arrow s : N → N,

such that for any object A of E, global element q : 1 → A, and arrow f : A → A, there exists a unique arrow u : N → A such that:

 u ∘ z = q, and
 u ∘ s = f ∘ u.

In other words, the triangle and square in the following diagram commute.

The pair (q, f) is sometimes called the recursion data for u, given in the form of a recursive definition:

 ⊢ u (z) = q
 y ∈E N ⊢ u (s y) = f (u (y))

The above definition is the universal property of NNOs, meaning they are defined up to canonical isomorphism. If the arrow u as defined above merely has to exist, that is, uniqueness is not required, then N is called a weak NNO.

Equivalent definitions 

NNOs in cartesian closed categories (CCCs) or topoi are sometimes defined in the following equivalent way (due to Lawvere): for every pair of arrows g : A → B and f : B → B, there is a unique h : N × A → B such that the squares in the following diagram commute.

This same construction defines weak NNOs in cartesian categories that are not cartesian closed.

Properties 

 Every NNO is an initial object of the category of diagrams of the form

 If a cartesian closed category has weak NNOs, then every slice of it also has a weak NNO.
 NNOs can be used for non-standard models of type theory in a way analogous to non-standard models of analysis. Such categories (or topoi) tend to have "infinitely many" non-standard natural numbers. (Like always, there are simple ways to get non-standard NNOs; for example, if z = s z, in which case the category or topos E is trivial.)
 Freyd showed that z and s form a coproduct diagram for NNOs; also, !N : N → 1 is a coequalizer of s and 1N, i.e., every pair of global elements of N are connected by means of s; furthermore, this pair of facts characterize all NNOs.

Examples 

 In Set, the category of sets, the standard natural numbers are an NNO. A terminal object in Set is a singleton, and a function out of a singleton picks out a single element of a set. (We could actually allow  to pick out any element of 𝐍, and the resulting NNO would be isomorphic to this one.) One can prove that the diagram in the definition commutes using mathematical induction.
 In the category of types of Martin-Löf type theory (with types as objects and functions as arrows), the standard natural numbers type nat is an NNO. One can use the recursor for nat to show that the appropriate diagram commutes.
 Assume that  is a Grothendieck topos with terminal object  and that  for some Grothendieck topology  on the category .

See also

 Peano's axioms of arithmetic
 Categorical logic

References

External links 
 Lecture notes from Robert Harper which discuss NNOs in Section 2.2: https://www.cs.cmu.edu/~rwh/courses/hott/notes/notes_week3.pdf
 A blog post by Clive Newstead on the -Category Cafe: https://golem.ph.utexas.edu/category/2014/01/an_elementary_theory_of_the_ca.html
 Notes on datatypes as algebras for endofunctors by computer scientist Philip Wadler: http://homepages.inf.ed.ac.uk/wadler/papers/free-rectypes/free-rectypes.txt
 Notes on the nLab: https://ncatlab.org/nlab/show/ETCS

Objects (category theory)
Topos theory
Categorical logic